The 2008–09 Macedonian Second Football League was the seventeenth season since its establishment. It began on 2 August 2008 and ended on 30 May 2009.

Participating teams

League table

Results

Promotion playoff

Relegation playoff

See also
2008–09 Macedonian Football Cup
2008–09 Macedonian First Football League

References

External links
Football Federation of Macedonia
MacedonianFootball.com

Macedonia 2
2
Macedonian Second Football League seasons